Below are all the KNVB Cup matches played by AFC Ajax. In the 1954–55, 1955–56 and 1959–60 seasons, there was no national cup in the Netherlands. Ajax has won the KNVB Cup a record total of 20 times. The matches are sorted by season. The goalscorers are shown in the right box.

Key 
 Group = Group stage
 R1 = First round
 R2 = Second round
 R3 = Third round (round of 64)
 R4 = Fourth round (round of 32)
 1/8 = 1/8 finals (round of 16)
 QF = Quarter-finals
 SF = Semi-finals
 RU = Runners-up
 W = Winners

Cup matches

Records and statistics

Highest scoring in the KNVB Cup

The following is a list of the players who have scored the most goals for Ajax in the KNVB Cup, with at least five goals scored.

Most goals in a single cup match
The following is a list of the players who have scored the most goals for Ajax in a single KNVB Cup match, with at least three goals scored.

References

External links 
KNVB.nl - Official website KNVB 
Netherlands Cup Finals, RSSSF.com
RSSSF History of the Dutch Cup
Minnows in Cup Finals, RSSSF.com
 League321.com - National cup results. 

KNVB Cup
KNVB Cup